Équipe Fédérale Nancy-Lorraine was a French football team in existence between 1943 and 1944. They won the 1944 Coupe de France Final.

References

Defunct football clubs in France
Association football clubs established in 1943
1943 establishments in France
Association football clubs disestablished in 1944
1944 disestablishments in France
Sport in Nancy, France
Football clubs in Grand Est